Giuseppe Berto (27 December 1914 – 1 November 1978) was an Italian writer and screenwriter.  He is mostly known for his novels Il cielo è rosso (The Sky Is Red) and Il male oscuro.

He was a prisoner at Camp Hereford from 1943 to 1946.

Selected works
 Il cielo è rosso a novel, published in 1947, about a group of displaced teenagers during World War II (The Sky Is Red – translation by Angus Davidson)
 Opere di Dio short stories, published in 1948 (The Works of God and Other Stories – translation by Angus Davidson)
 Il brigante a novel, published in 1951 (The Brigand – translation by Angus Davidson)
 Il male oscuro a "novel of neurosis and psychoanalysis", which in 1964 won him the Viareggio Prize and the Campiello Prize (Incubus – translation by William Weaver)
 La cosa buffa a novel, published in 1966 (Antonio in Love – translation by William Weaver)
 Anonimo Veneziano a novel, published in 1971 (Anonymous Venetian – translation by Valerie Southorn)
 La Passione secondo noi stessi (The Passion According to Ourselves), a 1972 play (not translated into English)
 La gloria a novel, published in 1978, about Judas's betrayal of Jesus (not translated into English)

Selected filmography
 Eleonora Duse (1947)
 La tua donna (1954)
 The Wanderers (1956)

References

External links
 
 "The girl goes to Calabria" at The Short Story Project.

1914 births
1978 deaths
People from Mogliano Veneto
20th-century Italian novelists
20th-century Italian male writers
20th-century Italian screenwriters
Viareggio Prize winners
Bancarella Prize winners
Premio Campiello winners
Italian male novelists
Italian male screenwriters